Paulina Dudek (born 16 June 1997) is a Polish professional footballer who plays as a centre-back for Division 1 Féminine club Paris Saint-Germain, which she captains, and the Poland national team.

Club career
Dudek is a youth academy graduate of Stilon Gorzów Wielkopolski. She joined Medyk Konin prior to the 2014–15 season and went on to win three consecutive Ekstraliga titles with the club. On 7 May 2017, she scored her first hat-trick in a 5–0 league win against AZS PWSZ Wałbrzych. In January 2018, she joined French club Paris Saint-Germain.

International career
Dudek captained Poland under-17 team to victory at the 2013 UEFA Women's Under-17 Championship. She has also been capped by Poland national team, with appearances during 2019 FIFA Women's World Cup qualifiers.

Career statistics

International

Scores and results list Poland's goal tally first, score column indicates score after each Dudek goal.

Honours
Medyk Konin
 Ekstraliga: 2014–15, 2015–16, 2016–17
Polish Cup: 2014–15, 2015–16, 2016–17

Paris Saint-Germain
 Division 1 Féminine: 2020–21
 Coupe de France féminine: 2017–18, 2021–22

Poland U17
UEFA Women's Under-17 Championship: 2013

References

External links
 
 
 

1997 births
Living people
Sportspeople from Gorzów Wielkopolski
Women's association football defenders
Polish women's footballers
Poland women's international footballers
Medyk Konin players
Paris Saint-Germain Féminine players
Division 1 Féminine players
Polish expatriate footballers
Polish expatriate sportspeople in France
Expatriate women's footballers in France